Barry Desmond (born 15 May 1935) is an Irish former Labour Party politician who served as a Member of the European Court of Auditors from 1994 to 2000, Minister for Health from 1982 to 1987, Minister for Social Welfare from 1982 to 1986 and a Minister of State from 1981 to 1982. He served as a Member of the European Parliament (MEP) for the Dublin constituency from 1989 to 1994 and a Teachta Dála (TD) from 1969 to 1989.

Early life
Desmond was born in Cork in 1935, and was educated at Coláiste Chríost Rí, the School of Commerce and University College Cork. He became a trade union official with the ITGWU (which would later merge with other trade unions, becoming SIPTU) and the Irish Congress of Trade Unions. Con was the President of the IT&GWU in Cork. His father Cornelius (Con) was Lord Mayor of Cork in 1965–66 and was active in the labour movement.

Political career
Desmond first entered Dáil Éireann at the 1969 general election, when he was elected as a Labour Party TD for Dún Laoghaire and Rathdown. He retained his seat there in 1973 and was then elected in 1977 at Dún Laoghaire, where he won a seat at every election until his retirement from the Dáil in 1989. From 1981 to 1982, he served as Minister of State at the Department of Finance with responsibility for Economic Planning, under Garret FitzGerald as Taoiseach. In 1982, after Michael O'Leary's resignation as Labour Party leader, Dick Spring was elected as the party's new leader and Desmond was chosen as his deputy.

After the November 1982 general election, Fine Gael and the Labour Party formed a majority government. In the second FitzGerald administration, Desmond was appointed Minister for Social Welfare and Minister for Health. FitzGerald began a major cabinet reshuffle in February 1986, with the intention to appoint him as Minister for Justice; Desmond refused, and Spring supported him in that attitude. The outcome was that he remained as Minister for Health while Gemma Hussey took on the Social Welfare portfolio.

On 20 January 1987, the Labour ministers resigned from the government, leading to the 1987 general election. At the election, Fianna Fáil returned to office. Desmond did not contest the 1989 general election, and on 15 June 1989 he was elected as a Labour Party MEP for Dublin, serving until 1994. He served as a member of the European Court of Auditors from 1994 to 2000, being replaced by Máire Geoghegan-Quinn.

After politics
He was elected president of the Maritime Institute of Ireland on 18 November 2006. He remains a member of the Council of the Maritime Institute of Ireland. As president he oversaw the revision of its articles of association and the securing of €3.2 million funding for the restoration of Mariners' Church, Dún Laoghaire, which houses the National Maritime Museum of Ireland.

Bibliography

References

External links

1935 births
Living people
Labour Party (Ireland) TDs
Members of the 19th Dáil
Members of the 20th Dáil
Members of the 21st Dáil
Members of the 22nd Dáil
Members of the 23rd Dáil
Members of the 24th Dáil
Members of the 25th Dáil
Alumni of University College Cork
Labour Party (Ireland) MEPs
MEPs for the Republic of Ireland 1989–1994
Presidential appointees to the Council of State (Ireland)
Ministers for Health (Ireland)
Ministers for Social Affairs (Ireland)
People from Cork (city)
People from Dún Laoghaire
Politicians from County Cork
Ministers of State of the 22nd Dáil
People educated at Presentation Brothers College, Cork
People educated at Coláiste Chríost Rí